Krrish, born Krishna Mehra, is a superhero appearing in the film series of the same name. He made his first appearance in Krrish, the second film of the series. The character was created by Rakesh Roshan and is portrayed by Hrithik Roshan, who reprises the role in Krrish 3, the third film of the franchise.

Concept and creation
After the  huge success of Koi... Mil Gaya (2003), the Roshans confirmed that they would produce a sequel. They announced that actors Hrithik Roshan and Rekha would return for the sequel, but that Preity Zinta would be replaced by Priyanka Chopra. Chopra also confirmed the same, adding, "The story will start where Koi... Mil Gaya ended." Rakesh Roshan hoped that the film would be remembered as the first to prove that the Indian film industry is equal to Hollywood. He decided to push the story forward by focusing on the son of the previous films's protagonist, who would inherit his father's special abilities. The story combined elements of Indian mythology (the main character's name Krishna alludes to the Hindu Lord Krishna), Chinese martial arts and Hollywood films to set itself up as a film of global significance.

Fictional character biography

Early life

 
Krishna Mehra is the son of Rohit Mehra and Nisha Mehra. In the first film Koi... Mil Gaya, Rohit is gifted with superpowers, with his mind and body at the peak of human potential. Krishna inherited Rohit's mental powers at a young age, while his physical powers grew as he became older and spent his time in the wilderness, surpassing Rohit's after a point.

Becoming Krrish

 
Due to his powers, Krishna was a genius and had a high IQ level even as a child. His grandmother Sonia takes the young Krishna to a remote mountain village in northern India to conceal his unique abilities. As he got older, Krishna's physical abilities grew alarmingly and even surpassed his father Rohit's by the age of 20. At around this time, Krishna meets Priya when she vacations in the country. Krishna and Priya grow close just before she departs for her home in Singapore and while Priya views Krishna as a good friend, Krishna has strong feelings of love. To appease her boss, Priya calls Krishna to join her in Singapore, where she tries to get him to perform heroic acts by using his powers. Krishna does not, as he had promised his grandmother that he would hide his abilities.
 
Krishna learns that his father Rohit was hired to help design a machine to see the future by Dr. Siddhant Arya. He further learned that Rohit had been killed by Dr. Arya when the former tried to destroy the machine, after learning of Dr. Arya's evil intentions. This caused his mother, Nisha, to die after being depressed and later injured after Krishna's birth. However, in the present timeline, Dr. Arya had used Rohit's notes and rebuilt the computer with a team of highly qualified scientists.
 
Krishna later goes to a circus where an explosion occurs. He puts on a mask to hide his identity in order to save some trapped children, after which he is given the identity of a superhero Krrish. One of the scientists in Dr. Arya's team tells Krishna that his father Rohit is alive; Dr. Arya was keeping Rohit alive since he needed Rohit's retina scan to start up the future-seeing computer. With his supernatural powers, Krishna follows Dr. Arya to his island lair, where a huge fight ensues between Krrish and the doctor's thugs. Krrish eventually defeats them and saves Priya and Rohit. In the final scene, Krrish wounds Dr. Arya. Before he dies, Dr. Arya asks Krrish who he is, and Krishna reveals himself. After revealing to Rohit that he is his son, Krishna takes Priya and Rohit back to India, reuniting him with Sonia.

Battle for Mumbai

 
Krishna resumes his mantle of a superhero; however, in this process, he is fired from a number of jobs in which he was hired.
 
As a deadly virus created by evil genius Kaal (a paralysed man with telekinetic powers) breaks loose in Mumbai, Krishna's DNA was able to purify it and his father Rohit was able to create an antidote. This increased the respect of Krrish as a hero among public.
 
Kaal eventually kidnaps Rohit and Priya, and leaves his spy Kaaya to Krishna; however, Kaaya betrays Kaal and falls in love with Krishna, telling him Kaal's hideout. Krrish rescues Priya but Kaaya is killed by Kaal, who takes Rohit's DNA to cure himself as his DNA matched with that of Rohit's. Kaal kills Krrish and escapes to attack Mumbai; however, Rohit revives Krrish using a solar experiment and absorbs the excess energy into his own body, sacrificing himself. Krishna, revived and empowered by the sun, fights Kaal to a stalemate and cannot seem to get an advantage; he resorts to using his father's solar experiment and kills Kaal with it, since there is no container for the excess energy.
 
Six months later, Krishna and Priya have a son, who is named Rohit (also nicknamed Ajay) by his mother and has apparently inherited Krishna's superhuman abilities.

Powers and abilities
Krrish inherited his abilities from his father Rohit Mehra, who was augmented by his extraterrestrial friend Jadoo. Krrish's abilities seem to excel Rohit's, as a younger Rohit had demonstrated vulnerability against human foes, while Krrish has comfortably handled superhuman foes like Kaal's mutants.

Krishna's earliest display of his exceptional capabilities was a demonstration of his tremendous intellect as a child. He has excellent observational skills that allow him to learn, adapt, and improvise whatever he sees, hears, or reads within a couple of minutes. He possesses a high IQ level, even as a child, and an eidetic memory, having inherited it from his father although not using it to its full potential.

Krrish possesses extraordinary powers like incredible strength, speed, reflexes, agility, stamina and senses. He has often stunned others with dazzling feats of speed, like spinning at high velocities, generating gales at the wake of his movements, and engaging many foes at once. In Krrish, Krrish was able to outrun a horse with his speed and leaping ability as a warm-up, and when serious, move to intercept bullets. Despite his great power, Krrish is vulnerable to bullets. In Krrish 3, he was able to hold up the side of a skyscraper while being under the pressure of Kaal's telekinesis, albeit with extreme effort and exertion. Krrish's stamina allowed him to keep fighting after using flight, fighting Kaal through buildings and holding up a portion of a huge building.

Thanks to his upbringing in wilderness, Krrish possesses special abilities related to nature, such as climbing mountains and fishing. He can communicate with animals, such as apes and monkeys. He can run, swim, jump and leap to a great extent. His vast leaping ability has not been defined yet, but if estimated, then he can leap 1/8 of a mile (201 meters),.

Krrish is a master of martial arts, and has proficient skill with weapons. He acquired these abilities after looking at Kristian Lee's performance, making use of his great observational skills and eidetic memory.

After being killed by Kaal and resurrected by his father, Krrish could use telekinesis, employing it to fly at supersonic speeds. He can also stop projectiles with telekinesis, even being able to redirect them with greater velocity.

Cultural impact
Though other Indian superheros such as Shaktimaan and Toofan existed before , Krrish
was the first major bollywood superhero which influenced a plethora of upcoming bollywood superhero movies. Krrish laid the foundation of high budget bollywood superhero genre and his influences are still relevant.

References

Fictional characters with superhuman strength
Fictional characters who can move at superhuman speeds
Fictional characters with accelerated healing
Fictional male martial artists
Science fiction film characters
Superheroes
Fictional vigilantes
Fictional Indian people